In Japan, structural engineers designing structures exceeding a certain floor area or number of storeys must submit drawings and calculations to the authorities, demonstrating that the building is safe (e.g. earthquake-resistant, etc.) "Structural Calculation Forgery Problem" (構造計算書偽造問題, kōzō keisansho gizō mondai) refers to a series of incidents, set off by the Ministry of Land, Infrastructure and Transport's November 17, 2005, announcement that structural engineer Hidetsugu Aneha of Aneha Architectural Design Office in Chiba Prefecture had falsified earthquake design calculations. A number of Japanese construction and real estate companies have had to declare bankruptcy due to their involvement in the affair, including Kimura Construction and Huser. Note that Aneha is frequently referred to as an architect, as Japan has a unique licensing system where structural engineers designing buildings are registered as first-class architects.

It is suggested that one of the causes for the problem was that the (privately owned) oversight agencies responsible for confirming compliance to Japanese safety standards did not detect the forgery. Prior to 1999, oversight was managed solely by regional governments, however, a change made to Japanese law that year allowed private organizations to conduct investigations as well.  It was said that these private organizations, such as "EHomes" and "Nihon ERI" did not adequately function in their oversight roles, however, it was later revealed that government oversight agencies had also failed to detect some instances of forgery.

Of 14 hotels that had already been built under false pretenses when the problem first came to light, two of them were shown to fail Japan's earthquake resistance standards. Because the concrete had insufficient reinforcing steel, there was a fear that an earthquake of magnitude 5 on the Japanese Shindo scale could cause the buildings to collapse. None of the buildings in question have yet collapsed, but the safety of high-rise buildings in earthquake-prone Japan has been called into question, particularly in the light of the 1995 Sampoong Department Store collapse in Korea.

Residents of the areas around the affected buildings live in a constant state of unease, not knowing if or when the buildings will collapse. Some hotels, unable to guarantee the safety of their customers, have ceased operations.

As the architect concerned in the matter has participated in the construction of a large number of buildings, the full extent of the problem is still unknown. In Japan, the incident was first publicized by bloggers.

Hidetsugu Aneha, Moriyoshi Kimura, Akira Shinozuka and Togo Fujita etc. were arrested on April 26, 2006, and Huser's president Susumu Ojima was arrested on May 17 of the same year.

References 
Much of the content of this article comes from the equivalent Japanese-language article, accessed on Jun. 29, 2006.

Corporate crime
Disasters in Japan
Japanese architectural history